Foidolite is a rare phaneritic (coarse-grained) intrusive igneous rock in which more than 60% (by volume) of light-coloured minerals are feldspathoids. Crystals of alkali feldspar, plagioclase, biotite, amphibole, pyroxene, and/or olivine may be present within the rock. The volcanic equivalents are termed foidite and phonolitic or tephritic foidites.

Some foidolites are a potential source of aluminium.

See also
QAPF diagram

References

External links
Foidolite (at University of Manitoba) - Retrieved 2009-05-15

Igneous rocks